Anita Catarina Malfatti (December 2, 1889 – November 6, 1964) is heralded as the first Brazilian artist to introduce European and American forms of Modernism to Brazil. Her solo exhibition in Sao Paulo, from 1917–1918, was controversial at the time, and her expressionist style and subject were revolutionary for the complacently old-fashioned art expectations of Brazilians who were searching for a national identity in art, but who were not prepared for the influences Malfatti would bring to the country. Malfatti's presence was also highly felt during the Week of Modern Art (Semana de Arte Moderna) in 1922, where she and the Group of Five made huge revolutionary changes in the structure and response to modern art in Brazil.

Historical background
The cultural history throughout Brazil is relevant to the changing theories of art's purpose and the consequential role that Modernist artists played. There were not many art institutions in Brazil and the country lacked a long theory of art technique that was institutional in other countries such as France with the Academie Royale de Peinture et Sculpture. By the end of the nineteenth century there was dissent in Rio's National School of Fine Arts and it was threatened to be closed by the Republicans who wanted all people who desired to become artists would have the ability to do so. This stemmed somewhat of a revolution where society became more receptive to new ideas by 1890. However, people who were too tied to the emperor were left from the artistic and cultural spectrum. By the 1920s there was a desire for a more specified and formal reconsideration of the arts and São Paulo was especially prominent in this area. However, along with the desire for renovation came the equally strong loyalty to a realistic portrayal of Brazilian life and culture.

Formal training
Malfatti's studies began in Mackenzie College in São Paulo, but the limited world of art in Brazil was not enough to satiate her curious mind and so she left for Berlin in 1912. Europe still remained an extremely important agent in defining artistic tendencies during this era. Hence, when Anita Malfatti went to Germany and studied with important artists Fritz Burger-Muhlfeld (1867–1927), Lovis Corinth (1858–1925) and Ernst Bischoff-Culm her influences and creative exposure were inflated. During this period she studied German Expressionism. German Expressionism emphasized the color pallette and artists were expected to paint with expressive amounts of emotion that was emphasized and where subjects of the work were frequently altered or jarred. A huge influence in her artistic style lay in her exposure to the Sonderbund exhibition in Cologne from May to September 1912. At the show a conglomeration of artists were exposed. Although there were many post-impressionist painters exhibited, Cubism stole the show by far. Homer Boss was included in the show and Malfatti went to study with him in New York in 1915. Malfatti also studied under artists George Bridgman, Dimitri Romanoffsky (s.d.-1971), however it was her experience with Homer Boss at the Independent School of Art that was most influential. Homer Boss was a huge impact on Malfatti's style because of his comprehensive studies of the human anatomy. He stressed the idea of understanding the muscular body which helped Malfatti to hone her own technique. New York was central in celebrating Cubism and Malfatti was an exceptional student within the Independent School of Art. Thus she was exposed to European style, which by the early twentieth centuries was even being forged with other styles. Europe's views on Modernism included a subjective treatment toward subjects as well as a highly repellent attitude towards the artistic movements proceeding modernism such as Realism or Romanticism. Malfatti's exposure to the European world of art allowed her a glimpse into an artistic world that she could never have known in São Paulo and gave her the more global viewpoint that she would pass on to other artists as well.

Controversial art
Malfatti had her own solo exhibition, Exposição de Pintura Moderna in São Paulo, Brazil from December 12, 1917, to January 11, 1918. Although Malfatti carefully chose her artworks so as not to offend—for example, she omitted her nudes from the exposition—her work was still highly criticized. In New York she had been heralded as another member of the avant-garde artists, but in Brazil her art was not recognized to be a positive contribution in the important search of nationalism and traditions within art. One of the reasons why Malfatti became such a scandal was because her art was displayed as a one-person show. Instead of having many different artists revealing their intentions of bringing Brazilian art into context of globally modernist innovations such as Post-Impressionism or Cubism to Brazil, Malfatti was seen as an individual who caused scandal to the carefully and rather conservatively minded Brazilians whose only desire was to continue the fin-du siecle romantic style. As Batista argues, Malfatti's thought was something similar to, "I'm not the only person who paints in this style unfamiliar to you; out there, this is the new, current art many others are experimenting with." However, despite the fact that Malfatti was an artist riding the global wave of thought and style, in Brazil she was simply viewed as an alien artist with no link to the Brazilian culture. Therefore, Malfatti's internationalism only further estranged her from Brazilian's expectations of art and of her art in particular.

Malfatti's art was in no way romantic. "Her formal innovations, including Cubist planar distortions, a vibrant high-colour palette and forceful drawing, were deemed unintelligible." However, Malfatti's art was celebrated by critics like Oswald de Andrade who had been familiar with Marinetti's futurist manifesto in Europe and translated that to Brazilian culture because her artwork reflected true freedom of subject and style. One of the huge factors of Brazilian modernism lay in the close association between the literary avant-garde to painting and sculpture. Lucie-Smith, in Latin American Art of the 20th Century, argues that this association prevented art from being created smoothly and progressively and furthermore provided artists with cultural, social and political responsibilities that the artists may not have been tied to. For example, Oswald de Andrade's “Pau-Brazil Poetry Manifesto” argues for:

Synthesis
Balance
Finished bodywork
Invention
Surprise
A new perspective
A new scale
Any natural effort in this direction will be good. Pau-Brazil Poetry 
With literary movements propelling the artistic explosion which was to become Brazilian modernism, Malfatti was painting in a time of political and social need for a fresh and creative artistic license. The synthesis between Andrade and other painters such as Tarsila do Amaral and the rest of the Group of Five was enormously important in replacing the older more conservative views of art and culture.

Yet another reason that Malfatti's exposition was viewed with such distaste lies in the fact that she was a woman. Malfatti's art was not seen in correlation to proper feminine etiquette of the era. She was criticized by critic Monteiro Lobato for having an inauthentic Brazilian spirit. Lucie-Smith among other art historians argue that due to the negative responses aroused toward Malfatti's art, her style never evolved further than her paintings exhibited in her 1917 exhibition. "Her later paintings are a step backwards, naïve and cheerfully folkoristic."

The Week of Modern Art in São Paulo, Brazil was created in respect to events in Europe such as Deauville, France which tended to celebrate futurism and progressive thought. Not only exhibiting art, the week included conferences, architectural exhibits, music and poetry readings. The point of the week was to celebrate the down-to-earth and free-thinking styles of art that could propagate change and social movement toward a less pretentious and more open-minded Brazilian mindset. Academic training was not stressed during the Week of Modern Art. In fact, there was an array of artistic styles exhibited, which also underlined the lack of direct organization of the exhibition. "Diverse directions were taken: from postimpressionism to half-baked cubism." Although Cubism and art deco later became a huge part of the Modernist movement, Malfatti's particular style was most influential in its initial impression to Brazil. She was a member of the Group of Five modern artists, but she is heralded more as the instigator of modernism rather than a propellant of the movement, as Tarsila do Amaral turned out to be. The artists in the Group of Five beyond Anita Malfatti were Tarsila do Amaral (1886–1973), Mário de Andrade (1893–1945), Oswald de Andrade (1890–1954) and Menotti Del Picchia (1892–1988). During the Week of Modern Art Anita Malfatti and Andrade organized classes for children in the hopes that stimulating children's interest in the spontaneity and creativity of art might help to further the modernist movement.

Malfatti's importance lies in the fact that she was the groundbreaking Brazilian painter, and furthermore an upper-class woman, who was exposed to global art's tendencies and who was able to bring these tendencies back to her Brazilian roots. In her search for her own artistic identity and her influence influenced by Modernist movements in Europe and America, her paintings accurately reflected the transformative twentieth century ideals. Although her art is never seen to transcend her initial breakthrough, that first impact was enough to impart a lasting legacy upon other Brazilian modernist painters as well as to herself.

Evolution of painting
Anita Malfatti's style of painting has been criticized for not evolving artistically after her shocking reintroduction to Brazil's artistic vision. Although Lucie-Smith is quite harsh saying that none of her works after The Idiot are of any importance, it is relevant to say that her style became much more toned down and "respectable" than it had been. Malfatti's exhibition in 1917–18 was even a toned-down version of what her artistic style was. Although she did not exhibit any of her nude pieces in her exhibition her style was still seen as extremely avant-garde. Her changing style can be well explained through a comparison of pieces throughout her career. The Idiot is her most influential piece and can be compared to a piece from the 1940s, O Canal e a Ponta, a much less controversial style and subject matter.

The Idiot is a perfect, and her most famous, example of this. Her color palette is extremely vivid and striking. Malfatti makes great use of primary colors, and she outlines her subject in black which clearly defines the shape of the chair and the woman, but which leaves the background indiscernible as to exactly what it is representing. The brush-strokes are large and imperfect as well and do not lend a solid feeling of spatial organization to the painting. Instead, the woman and the background seem to exist on the same plane, only being separated by color movement and shapes. The subject of a woman seated on a chair is nothing remarkable in the art world, but the subject title of the piece as well as the striking upward glance of the woman's eyes explains how it would be shocking to a conservative Brazilian culture. Not only is Malfatti painting an (as it would seem) underbelly representation of society, but she is doing so at a time when society was searching for a "Brazilian" style. All of a sudden it becomes uncertain what Malfatti is representing of Brazil.

However influential Malfatti's debut into the Modernist art scene was in Brazil, her later pieces of work seem to revert to an older and more serene style. No longer are her pieces shocking or with as intense of a mixture of Cubism and Impressionism. Her painting O Canal e a Ponta done in the 1940s is not nearly as stunning in style or character as The Idiot. The brush-strokes are much smaller and identical in relation to one another. They all go in the same direction, merely seen as a transitory means for color to be expressed. Malfatti's color palette is much less stunning as well. Although the colors in the painting are still lovely, they lack the vivid contrast which makes The Idiot so memorable. Instead of playing off of opposite colors, O Canal e a Ponta is one swell of deep shades that vary slightly from light reflections. The painting is still beautiful, it is simply much more traditional. The style is much more reminiscent of a toned down expressionism and does not utilise any qualities of Cubism which made her first pieces so planarly abstract. Even the subject matter is much more traditional and "European". It is a very tranquil setting of a bridge over a river with two trees on its sides a set of houses down the way and a serene sky. It is very harmonious but lacking in zest which would make her painting unique.

Malfatti is thought to have been rather discouraged from her reception of her highly debated exposition and so it would make sense that she would try to please her audience. However, at the same time, other artists such as Tarsila do Amaral were becoming highly evolved in their search for the Brazilian identity and culture. Although Malfatti's courage and formally trained style introduced a new development to Brazilians, she almost sacrificed her artistic career simply to pave the path for other artists to forge ahead. However she will always be celebrated as the artist who brought Modernism to Brazil and, as that is no small feat, her impact is legendary.

Exhibitions
Esposição de Pintura Moderna Anita Malfatti Dec 12, 1917 – Jan 11, 1918
Semana de Arte Moderna, São Paulo, 1922
Museum of Art São Paulo Assis, 1949
São Paulo Hall of Modern Art, 1951

Artworks
Treseburg Forest, Private Collection, Treseburg (Germany), 1913
Study for the Silly One, Museu de Arte Brasileira, São Paulo 1915–1916
O Barco, Museum of Modern Art, Rio de Janeiro, 1915
The Silly One, Museu de Arte Contemporânea da USP, 1916
Picture of Man, Museu de Arte Brasileira, São Paulo
Man of the Seven Colors, São Paulo, 1916
The Russian Student, São Paulo Museum of Art, São Paulo, 1916
Mildred, Private Collection, New York, 1915 or 1916
Ritmo, Collection of Museu de Arte Contemporânea da USP, São Paulo, 1915–1916
Tropical, Collection of Pinacoteca do Estado, São Paulo, 1916
The Yellow Man, Collection Mario de Andrade, Instituto de Estudos Brasileiros da USP, São Paulo, 1915–1916
The Chinese, 1921-1922
Dora Rainha do Frevo Museu de Arte Moderna de São Paulo 1934
Maria Antonia, Private Collection, 1937
 O Canal e a Ponte, Galeria 22, Arte Brasileira 1940s
Vaso de Flores, Galeria 22, Arte Brasileira, 1922
Nu, Galeria 22, Arte Brasileira, 1925

References
Amaral, Aracy; Kim Mrazek Hastings. Stages in the Formation of Brazil's Cultural Profile. The Journal of Decorative and Propaganda Arts. 1995.
Barbosa, Ana Marie. Brazilian Art Education at the Crossroads.Art Education, 1978. 
Michael Rosenthal: "Gainsborough, Thomas" Grove Art Online. Oxford University Press, July 30, 2007, http://www.groveart.com/Grove Art Online. Anita Malfatti
Harrison, Marguerite Itamar. Anita Malfatti: The Shifting Grounds of Modernism.

Notes

External links

 Between Exhibitions: Anita Malfatti and the Shifting Ground of Modernism, an essay by Marguerite Itamar Harrison.

1889 births
1964 deaths
20th-century Brazilian painters
20th-century Brazilian women artists
Modern artists
Brazilian women painters
Brazilian people of Italian descent
People from São Paulo
Mackenzie Presbyterian University alumni
Brazilian women artists